Edra Airport  is located near Edra, Alberta, Canada.

References

External links
Page about this airport on COPA's Places to Fly airport directory

Registered aerodromes in Alberta
Transport in the Regional Municipality of Wood Buffalo